Doudou may refer to:

People 
 As a surname
 Émile Boga Doudou (1952–2002), Ivorian politician
 Rose Doudou Guéï (died 2002), predecessor of Simone Gbagbo as First Lady of Côte d'Ivoire

 As a given name
 Doudou, a character in the Singaporean Chinese drama Rhapsody in Blue
 Doudou (born 1980), a French footballer who played for AS Monaco and Queens Park Rangers
 Doudou Aouate (born 1977), Israeli football goalkeeper
 Doudou Diaw (born 1975), Senegalese football player
 Doudou Diène (born 1941), United Nations Special Rapporteur on contemporary forms of racism, racial discrimination
 Doudou Gouirand (born 1940), French jazz saxophonist and composer
 Doudou Gueye, former leader of the Senegalese Popular Movement
 Doudou Masta (born 1971), French hip-hop artist
 Doudou Mangni (born 1993), Italian footballer
 Doudou N'Diaye Rose (1930–2015), Senegalese drummer, composer and band leader
 Doudou Ndoye (born 1944), Senegalese lawyer and politician
 Doudou Thiam (1926–1999), Senegalese diplomat, politician and lawyer
 Doudou Touré (born 1991), Mauritanian footballer

Other
 Ducasse de Mons, a popular feast that happens every year during the Trinity Sunday in the town of Mons, Belgium
 Doudou, a sub-division of the French Indian rupee
 "Doudou" (song), a 2020 song by Aya Nakamura
 Dudou, a female undergarment and blouse diminutively known as a doudou in Chinese
 Moukalaba-Doudou National Park, Gabon

See also
 Dudu (disambiguation)